The Teushen language is an indigenous language of Argentina, which may be extinct. It was spoken by the Teushen people, a nomadic hunter-gatherer people of Patagonia, who lived between the Puelche people to their north and the Tehuelche people to the south, who occupied the central part of the Tierra del Fuego region. The tribe is now extinct.

The language is thought to be related to the Selk'nam, Puelche, and Tehuelche languages. These collectively belong to the Chonan language family.

In the early 19th century, some Tehuelche people also spoke Teushen.

See also
Haush language
Kawésqar language
Selknam language
Tehuelche language
Yaghan language

Notes

References
Adelaar, Willen F. H. and Pieter Muysken. The languages of the Andes. Cambridge: Cambridge University Press, 2004. .

Fuegian languages
Chonan languages
Extinct languages of South America
Indigenous languages of the South American Cone
Languages of Argentina
Languages extinct in the 1950s